John Douglas Campbell "Bill" Hammon (3 March 1914 – 12 January 2004) was a rugby union player who represented Australia.

Hammon, a centre, was born in Invercargill, New Zealand and claimed 1 international rugby cap for Australia.

References

Australian rugby union players
Australia international rugby union players
1914 births
2004 deaths
Rugby union players from Invercargill
Rugby union centres